The Type 38 12 cm howitzer (1905)  is an obsolete Japanese field piece used by the Imperial Japanese Army during World War I, Second Sino-Japanese War, and World War II.  The Type 38 designation was given to this gun as it was accepted in the 38th year of Emperor Meiji's reign (1905).  It was encountered by Allied forces for the first time on Iwo Jima, and it may have been used as an emergency or substitute weapon.

Description
It is characterized by a very short barrel, box trail, and large wooden wheels.  It has an interrupted screw breech block and Hydro-spring recoil-mechanism. No gun shield is used with this weapon.

Elevating and traversing hand wheels, and panoramic sight are at the left of the breech. The firing mechanism is a lanyard actuated percussion type.

Armor-piercing, Armor-piercing High Explosive, HEAT, and Shrapnel shells have been recovered.  The projectiles have the usual color markings and are similar in appearance to 75mm APHE and shrapnel shells.  The APHE shell weighs  while the shrapnel shell contains 300 lead balls.

References

Notes

Bibliography
 US War Department Japanese Artillery Weapons, CINPAC-CINPOA Bulletin 152 45" 1 July 1945
 War Department Special Series No 25 Japanese Field Artillery October 1944

External links

3
World War I artillery of Japan